Renick Bell is an American musician, programmer, and teacher based in Tokyo, notable as a pioneer of live coded music performance including at algoraves, and for his algorithmic music releases. Bell creates his music using his self-built live coding system Conductive.

Career

Premier of Algorave in Asia 
The very first algoraves in Asia, organized by Renick Bell, were held in Tokyo and Hong Kong

 January 5, 2014 in Tokyo 
 May 20, 2016 in Hong Kong

Releases (Algorave) 
Renick Bell's releases include an

 EP for Lee Gamble's UIQ label in 2016;  
 LPs for Rabit's Halcyon Veil;  
 Seagrave Records in 2018.

Live coding performances 
Some notable performances include a duo with Fis at the Berlin Atonal festival in Berlin in August 2017 and a solo performance at the Unsound Festival in Krakow in 2018.

References 

Algorave
Live coding
Year of birth missing (living people)
Living people
American pop keyboardists